Grande-Rivière-du-Nord is a commune in the Grande-Rivière-du-Nord Arrondissement, in the Nord Department of Haiti. Jean-Jacques Dessalines was born there in 1758 on the Cormiers plantation.

References

Populated places in Nord (Haitian department)
Communes of Haiti